Kirov Raion is a name of several city districts in Ukraine

 Kirovskyi District, Donetsk
 name of Tsentralnyi District, Dnipro before 2015
 name of Pechersk Raion before 1944

See also
 Kirovsky District (disambiguation)
Kirovske Raion (Kirovsky District), a district of the Autonomous Republic of Crimea, named after Kirovske